In computing, ren (or rename) is a command in various command-line interpreters (shells) such as COMMAND.COM, cmd.exe, 4DOS, 4NT and Windows PowerShell. It is used to rename computer files and in some implementations (such as AmigaDOS) also directories. It is analogous to the Unix mv command. However, unlike mv, ren cannot be used to move files, as a new directory for the destination file may not be used. Alternatively, move may be used if available. On versions of MS-DOS that do not support the move command (older than 6.00), the user would simply copy the file to a new destination, and then delete the original file. A notable exception to this rule is DOSBox, in which ren may be used to move a file, since move is not supported.

Implementations

The command is available in the operating systems Digital Research CP/M, MP/M, Cromemco CDOS, MetaComCo TRIPOS, DOS, IBM OS/2, Microsoft Windows, ReactOS, SymbOS, and DexOS.

Multics includes a rename command to rename a directory entry. It can be contracted to rn.

Stratus OpenVOS, DEC RT-11, OS/8, RSX-11, Intel ISIS-II, iRMX 86, TOPS-20, Zilog Z80-RIO, TSC FLEX, Microware OS-9, DR FlexOS, IBM/Toshiba 4690 OS, HP MPE/iX, THEOS/OASIS, and OpenVMS also provide the rename command which in some cases can be contracted to ren.

The rename command is supported by Tim Paterson's SCP 86-DOS. On MS-DOS, the command is available in versions 1 and later.

In Windows PowerShell, ren is a predefined command alias for the Rename-Item Cmdlet which basically serves the same purpose.

TSL PC-MOS includes an implementation of rename. 
Like the rest of the operating system, it is licensed under the GPL v3.

It is also available in the open source MS-DOS emulator DOSBox.

Example
ren filename newname
ren *.htm *.html

Another example. This will rename a default video found in Windows 7 with a new name:
rename "C:\Users\Public\Videos\Sample Videos\Wildlife.wmv" "Wildlife2.wmv"

The first parameter may contain a drive and a path, but the second parameter must contain only the new filename.

To remove certain characters of a file name in Microsoft Windows command prompt (XP & Higher) :

rename "abcd*.txt" "////*.txt"This will remove abcd from the file name.

Notes: 

 Same number of / as the number of initial characters to remove.
 Double quotes for both arguments.
 It doesn't remove  . from file name

See also

List of DOS commands
List of PowerShell commands

References

Further reading

External links
ren | Microsoft Docs

CP/M commands
Internal DOS commands
MSX-DOS commands
OS/2 commands
ReactOS commands
Windows commands
Microcomputer software
Windows administration